Aham is a 1992 Indian Malayalam-language drama film directed by Rajeevnath and written by Venu Nagavally from a story by Rajeevnath. The film stars Mohanlal, Urvasi, and Ramya Krishna. The soundtrack was composed by Raveendran and cinematography was handled by Santhosh Sivan and Venu

Plot

Aham means self. The film revolves around Siddharthan, a bank manager, a man who has different outlook to life. He wants to be perfect in every thing that he does and even wants people around him to accept the way he thinks. He lacks love from his parents and develops hatred towards his father, a judge, who was responsible for the death of their servant and his family, who were the only friends of Siddharthan. Growing up Siddharthan becomes very narrow minded and looks at every one else's behavior with doubt and prejudice. He doubts the relationship between his wife Renjini (Urvashi) and her friend (Suresh Gopi) to the extent that he goes and warns him from ever entering his house to meet Renjini. Renjini is not able to adjust with his crazy lifestyle. She wants to become self-reliant but this creates suspicion in Siddharthan's mind. On his birthday when Renjini out of her earnings from a part-time job (that Siddarth is unaware of) buys him a tie, he doubts her of infidelity and in a resulting argument and the subsequent struggle Ranjini falls down the stairs and goes into a coma and later on she dies. Siddharthan loses his mental balance. Later he ends up in a mental asylum, where he writes a diary recounting and recollecting the deeds that he has done and repents for it. Meanwhile a researcher from America develops a friendship with Siddharthan and makes him her subject for her research. Siddharthan unaware of her motive, develops feelings for her which gets shattered when he finds out about the research. Ultimately Siddharthan who thinks that the only way to reconcile with his dead wife and to get love was to commit suicide.

Cast

 Mohanlal as Sidharthan
 Urvasi as Renjini Pilla
 Ramya Krishna as Mariyana Varghese
 Vaishnavi as Vimala Mathews
 Neena Gupta as Mother Nobble
 Suresh Gopi as Capt. Mahedran (cameo)
 Nedumudi Venu as Keshavan Pilla
 Jagathy Sreekumar as M.P Kidappadam ( M.P.K)
 Maniyanpilla Raju as Marfee Markose
 Adoor Pankajam as Mariyamma
 Karamana Janardanan Nair as Kutti Sahib
 Vijayaraghavan as Pathrose
 Pujappura Ravi as Warrier
 Kunchan as Jacob Fernadez
 Rajeev Nath as Dr.Menon
 Vasudevan Paravattom as Sidharthan's father (cameo)
 Swapna Ravi as Usha
 Usharani as Achamma Tharakan
 K.P.A.C. Sunny as Tharakan
 M. G. Soman as K.P Pilla
 Rajeev Rangan as Mathews (Cameo Appearance)
 T. P. Madhavan as Cameo Appearance
 Nandhu as Cameo Appearance
 Jagannathan as Cameo Appearance

Soundtrack

Raveendran composed the film's original soundtrack, the lyrics were written by Kavalam Narayana Panicker and Konniyoor Bhas. All songs was sung by K. J. Yesudas. The soundtrack which consists of 5 songs was released by the music label Ranjini Cassettes on 25 September 1992.

Accolades
Kerala State Film Awards
 Best Cinematography - Santhosh Sivan, Venu
 Best Processing Lab - Vijaya Colour Lab

References

External links
 

1992 films
1990s Malayalam-language films
Films directed by Rajeevnath
Films scored by Raveendran